Cramo Go:green (UCI code AGG) was a professional women's cycling team, based in Sweden, which competed in elite road bicycle racing events such as the UCI Women's Road World Cup.

Major wins
2010
Linköping, Madelene Olsson
Overall Wänershofs 2-dages, Malin Rydlund
Stage 2 Malin Rydlund
Overall Silkeborg Viborg Hammel, Jennie Stenerhag
Stage 1, Madelene Olsson
Stages 2 & 3, Jennie Stenerhag
Distriktsmesterskab Time Trial Championships, Henriette Lygum Christensen

Roster
2013 roster. Ages as of 1 January 2013.

National champions
2009
 Sweden Road Race, Jennie Stenerhag

References

UCI Women's Teams
Cycling teams based in Sweden
Cycling teams established in 2010
Cycling teams disestablished in 2013